Singaporeans in the United Kingdom may refer to people who have full or partial Singaporean origin or descent, born or settled in the United Kingdom, or Singaporeans in Britain which are high-income expatriate professionals as well as skilled workers, with many still maintaining close ties with Singapore, especially those who continue to retain Singaporean citizenship while having permanent residency in Britain, as well as students.

As Singapore is a multi-racial country, a Singaporean British could either be of Chinese, Malay or Indian descent, the main races of Singapore.

Background 

The story of the Singaporean community in the UK has some similarities follows that of the British Chinese community, as Singaporeans of Chinese descent (see Chinese Singaporean) make up around 70% of the population. The Singaporean diaspora in Britain stems from Singapore's history as a former British colony (as part of the Straits Settlements' capital from 1826 to 1942, and separately as the Crown Colony of Singapore from 1946 to 1959), and its current membership in the Commonwealth of Nations.

Population
40,474 Singaporean-born people were recorded by the 2001 UK Census, with 40,180 of those living in Great Britain. The Singaporean-born population of Great Britain has increased by 19 per cent since the 1991 Census, when 33,751 Singaporean-born people were recorded.

The Office for National Statistics estimates that, in 2009, 41,000 Singaporean-born people were resident in the UK.

The distribution of Singaporean-born residents according to the 2001 census is shown on the map. Nine of the ten census tracts with the most Singaporean-born residents in 2001 are in London. The most popular tracts were Hyde Park, Kensington, Holborn, Chelsea, Southall West, Regent's Park, Cambridge West, Highgate, East Ham South, Richmond North.

Notable individuals 

The list below includes British people of Singaporean descent and Singaporean immigrants to the UK, regardless of ethnicity. This is a non-exhaustive list.

 Richard Sreeharan, ComputerAid International
 Fiona Bruce, journalist 
 Nigel Callaghan, footballer
 Michael Chan, Baron Chan, physician and politician
 Leslie Charteris, thriller writer and screenwriter
 Matt Carmichael, footballer
 Richard Fortin, cricketer
 Wendy Kweh, actress
 Nancy Lam, celebrity chef
 Soo Bee Lee, soprano singer
 Jasmine Lowson, news presenter
 Vanessa-Mae, pop and classical musician
 Melville McKee, racing driver
 Sam Quek, former field hockey player and Olympic gold medalist
 Clive Rees, rugby union player
 Louis Theroux, broadcaster
 Paul Thompson, head coach of the Coventry Blaze and the Great Britain national men's ice hockey team
 Colin Thurston, recording engineer and producer
 Zing Tsjeng, journalist and author
 Anjana Vasan, actress
 Nancy Yuen, singer
 Jen Theng Craven or Jin-Theng Craven (née Goh), daughter of former Prime Minister of Singapore Goh Chok Tong
 Jerrold Yam, poet and lawyer

See also 
 Singaporeans
 British East and Southeast Asian
 British Singapore — former colony & part of British Malaya and Straits Settlements.
 East Asians in the United Kingdom
 Chinese Singaporeans
 Indian Singaporeans
 Malay Singaporeans

References

External links 
 BBC Born Abroad - Singapore
 The Singaporean Embassy in London

Asian diaspora in the United Kingdom
 
Immigration to the United Kingdom by country of origin
United Kingdom